Bečanović is a surname. Notable people with the surname include:

Aleksandar Bečanović (born 1971), Montenegrin poet, translator and critic
Dragomir Bečanović (born 1965), judoka
Miladin Bečanović (born 1973), Montenegrin footballer
Stefan Bečanović (born 1990), sprinter

Serbian surnames